"The First Gun Is Fired: May God Protect the Right" was the first song written specifically for the American Civil War. It was first published and distributed three days after the Battle of Fort Sumter. George F. Root, who wrote it the day before it first appeared in print, is said to have produced the most songs of anyone about the war, over thirty in total.

"The First Gun Is Fired" was first performed in public at a patriotic rally in Metropolitan Hall in Chicago, Illinois, by two well-known singers of the day, the Lombard Brothers. Root distributed copies of the sheet music to the audience. The song caught on with the public and became one of the most popular tunes of the Civil War.

Lyrics

1.
The first gun is fired!
May God protect the right!
Let the freeborn sons of the North arise
In power's avenging night;
Shall the glorious Union our father's have made,
By ruthless hands be sunder'd,
And we of freedom sacred rights
By trait'rous foes be plunder'd?

Chorus—Arise! arise! arise!
And gird ye for the fight,
And let our watchword ever be,
"May God protect the right!"

2.
The first gun is fired!
Its echoes thrill the land,
And the bounding hearts of the patriot throng,
Now firmly take their stand;
We will bow no more to the tyrant few,
Who scorn our long forbearing,
But with Columbia's stars and stripes
We'll quench their trait'rous daring.

Chorus—Arise! arise! arise!
And gird ye for the fight,
And let our watchword ever be,
"May God protect the right!"

3.
The first gun is fired!
Oh, heed the signal well,
And the thunder tone as it rolls along
Shall sound oppression's knell;
For the arm of freedom is mighty still,
But strength shall fail us never,
Its strength shall fail us never,
That strength we'll give to our righteous cause,
And our glorious land forever.

Chorus—Arise! arise! arise!
And gird ye for the fight,
And let our watchword ever be,
"May God protect the right!"

References

External links
 Sheet music for "The First Gun Is Fired"

1861 songs
First Gun
Songs written by George Frederick Root